Limousin can refer to:
 Limousin (administrative region), the former administrative region of southwest-central France
 Limousin (province), former province of France under the Ancien Régime
 Limousin dialect, a dialect of the Occitan language
 Limousin (cattle), a breed of beef cattle originating from the Limousin

See also
 Limousine, a chauffeured vehicle
 "Limousine" (song), a 1986 song by Hubert Kah
 The Limousines, American band